The Church of the Intercession of the Holy Virgin was a Russian Orthodox church in Elizavetinskaya stanitsa, Rostov Oblast, Russia.

History
Originally in Elizavetinskaya village there was a reconstructed wooden church, which transported from Aksayskaya village in 1793. Because of frequent floods, it fell into disrepair. Because of that, in 1812 a three-altar church was laid in honor of the Intercession of the Blessed Virgin Mary. It was completed and consecrated 12 years afterward.

The Intercession Church was built of stone, it had a bell tower and three altars, consecrated in the name of the Intercession of the Mother of God, in honor of apostles Peter and Paul, in honor of the Great Martyr Paraskeva. The building of the church  was plastered outside and inside, covered with iron, all the domes were painted green. At the tops of the chapels of the church and the bell tower there were a gilded ball and a cross; The Intercession Church had eight bells, the largest of them weighed 546 poods.

The church was destroyed in 1938. Only its foundation has survived. After the collapse of the USSR, the Chapel of the Intercession of the Blessed Virgin Mary was built on the site of the destroyed church.

References

Churches in Rostov Oblast
Churches completed in 1824
Buildings and structures demolished in 1938
Demolished churches in the Soviet Union
Cultural heritage monuments of regional significance in Rostov Oblast
Russian Orthodox church buildings in Russia